Dragan Bošnjak (19 October 1956 – 27 March 2019) was a Serbian footballer who played as a midfielder.

Career
After playing for Spartak Subotica in the 1975–76 Yugoslav Second League, Bošnjak spent three and a half years with Vojvodina and won the Mitropa Cup in the 1976–77 season, before moving to Dinamo Zagreb in the winter of 1980. He helped them win the Yugoslav First League in the 1981–82 season, as well as two Yugoslav Cups (1980 and 1983). In 1985, Bošnjak spent half a season at Dinamo Vinkovci.

At international level, Bošnjak was a member of the Yugoslavia under-21 team that won the UEFA Under-21 Championship in 1978.

Death
Bošnjak died in his home-town of Kanjiža on 28 March 2019.

Honours

Club
 Vojvodina
 Mitropa Cup: 1976–77

 Dinamo Zagreb
 Yugoslav First League: 1981–82
 Yugoslav Cup: 1979–80, 1982–83

International
 Yugoslavia
 UEFA Under-21 Championship: 1978

References

External links
 

1956 births
2019 deaths
People from Kanjiža
Association football midfielders
FK Spartak Subotica players
FK Vojvodina players
GNK Dinamo Zagreb players
HNK Cibalia players
Serbian footballers
Yugoslav First League players
Yugoslav footballers
Yugoslavia under-21 international footballers